Ishak Mohammed is a Cook Islands footballer who plays as a forward for Manukau City AFC and the Cook Islands national football team. He made his debut for the national team on August 31, 2015 in a 3–0 win against Tonga.

References

External links
 

Living people
1991 births
Association football forwards
Cook Islands international footballers
Cook Island footballers